Alexander Sloan (11 November 1879 – 16 November 1945) was Labour MP for South Ayrshire, in Scotland.

Sloan worked as a coal miner in Ayrshire, and joined the Ayrshire Miners' Union.  The union was affiliated to the National Union of Scottish Mineworkers, and Sloan served as general secretary of both organisations.  In addition, he served as a Labour Party member of Ayrshire County Council for many years.

Sloan was elected to Parliament in the 1939 South Ayrshire by-election, and served until his death, in 1945.

One of his brothers – one of four who died in the First World War – was the footballer Donald Sloan. His great-great-granddaughter, Katy Clark, is a member of the House of Lords, The Scottish Parliament and was the Labour MP for North Ayrshire and Arran from 2005 to 2015.

References

 Sanny Sloan, The Miners' MP (2015, revised 2018) – biography by his great-granddaughter, Esther Davies

External links 
 

1945 deaths
Members of the Parliament of the United Kingdom for Scottish constituencies
Miners' Federation of Great Britain-sponsored MPs
National Union of Mineworkers-sponsored MPs
Scottish Labour MPs
UK MPs 1935–1945
UK MPs 1945–1950
1879 births